East West Records (stylized as eastwest) is a record label formed in 1955, distributed and owned by Warner Music Group, headquartered in London, England.

History

Upon its creation in 1955 by Atlantic Records, the label had one hit with the Kingsmen's "Week End" and went into hibernation until 1990, when Atlantic revamped the imprint as EastWest Records America. In America, Atlantic senior VP Sylvia Rhone was appointed Chair/CEO of the fledgling label. Under Rhone's leadership, EastWest Records America shot to mega success with several multiplatinum acts such as En Vogue, Pantera, Yo-Yo, Adina Howard, Das EFX, Snow, Gerald Levert, AC/DC, The Rembrandts, Dream Theater, Missy Elliott and MC Lyte. EastWest also distributed other imprints, such as Interscope Records, Motor Jams Records, Mecca Don Records and The Gold Mind Inc. Meanwhile, over at the Electric Lighting Station in London (headquarters of WEA International in the United Kingdom) artists such as The Beloved, Tanita Tikaram, Chris Rea, Billy Mackenzie (as Associates) and Simply Red, who had ended up on WEA after divisions/labels such as Elektra, Sire and Magnet Records had been reorganized or closed down, found themselves on the new EastWest label, with  newer signings such as The Wildhearts and Sabrina Johnston joining the label in the following years. 

In 1994, Rhone was appointed Chairman & CEO of Atlantic's sister label Elektra Records in America. At the time, East West (along with most of its roster) also broke away from the Atlantic umbrella to continue to operate under Rhone at Elektra. By the new millennium, budget cuts at Warner Music Group resulted in East West being absorbed into Elektra, where some of its acts were shifted over as well. In 2004, Time Warner sold Warner Music Group to private investors led by Edgar Bronfman Jr. Subsequently, more budget cuts were made, this time resulting in Elektra to be absorbed into Atlantic.

2015–present: Relaunch
In 2005, WMG reactivated the East West imprint as an in-house label, which primarily markets and distributes other rock music-based labels. East West today operates under Warner's Alternative Distribution Alliance, the successor to Independent Label Group. East West Records was revived in the UK in 2014 under the direction of Max Lousada, Chairman & CEO, Warner Music UK. The resurrected label was headed up by Dan Chalmers (as President for Rhino UK, East West Records and ADA UK) until being poached by former Warner Music Group CEO Lyor Cohen, for YouTube Music in 2019. By 2021, Jeremy Marsh was head of Rhino UK and East West Records, with Westlife being announced as new signings on St Patrick’s Day. 
Other acts to have signed to the reactivated heritage label in the last six years include Bette Midler, Jools Holland, Beverley Knight, Amelia Lily, Robert Plant, Si Cranstoun, Boyzone, The Corrs and Busted, while Simply Red returned after 15 years on their own label to release the Big Love album.

List of East West Records artists
Below is a selected list of musical artists signed under the East West Records label in the past and present.

AC/DC
Alexander Armstrong
Boyzone
Busted
Das EFX
The Corrs
Dream Theater
Ed Sheeran
En Vogue
Shane Filan
Jools Holland
Beverley Knight
Bette Midler
Pantera
Robert Plant
Lil Mo
Rumer
Scouting For Girls
Simply Red
The Sisters of Mercy
Sheridan Smith
Tegan and Sara
Westlife

References

External links
Discography of 1957–1959 East West singles

Record labels established in 1955
British record labels
British companies established in 1955
Warner Music labels
Labels distributed by Warner Music Group
Pop record labels
Rock record labels
Hip hop record labels
Electronic music record labels